Afërdita Dreshaj (born 19 July 1986) is an Albanian-American singer and model. Crowned as Miss Universe Kosovo 2011, Dreshaj represented the nation at the Miss Universe 2011 pageant and finished among the top 16.

Life and career

1986–2011: Early life and Miss Universe 

Afërdita Dreshaj was born on 19 July 1986 into an Albanian family in the city of Titograd, Yugoslavia (present-day Podgorica, Montenegro). In January 2011, Dreshaj was crowned as Miss Universe Kosovo and the nation's representative at the Miss Universe 2011 pageant. Held in São Paulo, Brazil, Dreshaj advanced from a total of 89 contestants into semi-finals of Miss Universe 2011 finishing among the top 16.

Personal life 

She began her career as a model at age 17, upon being discovered by a photographer. She was previously engaged to Albanian singer Shpat Kasapi.Dreshaj currently lives in Michigan USA, with her husband, the Czech ice hockey defenseman Jakub Kindl.
Since March 2021 she became a mother to a boy named Sky Blue Kindl.

References

External links 

1986 births
Living people
Albanian-language singers
Musicians from Podgorica
Kosovan female models
Albanian female models
21st-century Albanian women singers
Kosovan beauty pageant winners
Miss Universe 2011 contestants
Albanians in Montenegro
Albanian Roman Catholics
21st-century Albanian models